Clivina fossor is a species of ground beetle in the subfamily Scaritinae. It was described by Carl Linnaeus in 1758.

References

fossor
Beetles described in 1758
Taxa named by Carl Linnaeus